Seppänen is a Finnish surname derived from the occupation of blacksmith ("seppä"). Notable people with the surname include:

Elias Seppänen (born 2003), Finnish racing driver
Ensio Seppänen
Esko Seppänen
Iiro Seppänen
Timo Seppänen
Tytti Seppänen

Finnish-language surnames